In mathematics, a complete field is a field equipped with a metric and complete with respect to that metric. Basic examples include the real numbers, the complex numbers, and complete valued fields (such as the p-adic numbers).

Constructions

Real and complex numbers

The real numbers are the field with the standard euclidean metric . Extending the reals by its algebraic closure gives the field  (since its absolute Galois group is ). In this case,  is also a complete field, but this is not the case in many cases.

p-adic

This is a case where the field is not algebraically closed. Typically, the process is to take the separable closure and then complete it again. This field is usually denoted

Function field of a curve

For the function field  of a curve  every point  corresponds to an absolute value, or place, .

References

See also

 
 
 
 
 
 
 
 
 
 
 
 
 
 
 
 
 

Field (mathematics)